The Norwegian Chess Federation (often abbreviated as NSF) is the national federation of chess in Norway. It was founded in 1914. On 10 July 2022, Joachim Nilsen was elected new chairman.

The organisation's headquarters are in Oslo. It is an affiliate of the World Chess Federation.
The Norwegian Chess Federation organizes the Norwegian Chess Championship and publishes The Norwegian Chess Magazine.

See also

European Chess Union

References

External links
Norwegian Chess Federation

National members of the European Chess Union
Chess in Norway
Chess
1914 establishments in Norway
Sports organizations established in 1914
Chess organizations
1914 in chess